Zagir Ismagilov Ufa State Institute of Arts is one of the leading academic institutions of higher education of Russia. At the same time it is a unique educational institution of Bashkortostan, graduating professionals in the field of music, theatre and art.

Ufa State Institute of Arts comprises four faculties and 21 departments, where teachers train students for 33 specialties. Training students is carried out by full-time and part-time programs on both free and commercial basis.

History
The institute was opened in 1968 as a branch of the Gnesins State Musical-Pedagogical Institute (now is the Gnessin State Musical College). Today it has the status of a state institution of the Ministry of Culture of the Russian Federation.

Notable alumni
Ildar Abdrazakov, opera singer
Askar Abdrazakov, soloist of the Mariinsky Theater (St. Petersburg)
Aigul Akhmetshina, soloist of the Royal Opera House Covent Garden (London)
Alfiya Karimova, the leading soloist of the Astana Opera (Kazakhstan)

Gallery

References

Education in Ufa
Art schools in Russia